Harold Winslow "Hal" Griffen (March 1, 1902 – December 31, 1947) was an American football player and coach.  He played professionally as a Center and tackle with the New York Yankees, Green Bay Packers and Portsmouth Spartans of the National Football League (NFL).  He also served as the first head coach for the Spartans, for one season in 1930.  Griffen played College football at the University of Iowa.

See also
 List of Green Bay Packers players

References

External links
 Coaching record

1902 births
1947 deaths
American football centers
American football tackles
Detroit Lions head coaches
Green Bay Packers players
Iowa Hawkeyes football players
New York Yankees (AFL) players
Portsmouth Spartans players
Sportspeople from Sioux City, Iowa
Players of American football from Iowa